Golden Boot or Golden Shoe may refer to:

Awards

Association football 
 Golden Boot Award, FIFA competition award for top goalscorer of tournament
 FIFA World Cup Golden Boot, FIFA World Cup award for top goalscorer of tournament
 FIFA U-20 World Cup Golden Boot, FIFA U-20 World Cup award for top goalscorer of tournament
 FIFA U-17 World Cup Golden Boot, FIFA U-20 World Cup award for top goalscorer of tournament
 FIFA Women's World Cup Golden Boot, FIFA Women's World Cup award for top goalscorer of tournament
 FIFA U-20 Women's World Cup Golden Boot, FIFA U-20 Women's World Cup award for top goalscorer of tournament
 FIFA U-17 Women's World Cup Golden Boot, FIFA U-17 Women's World Cup award for top goalscorer of tournament
 FIFA Confederations Cup Golden Boot, FIFA Confederations Cup award for top goalscorer of tournament
 FIFA Club World Cup Golden Shoe, FIFA Club World Cup award for top goalscorer of tournament
 Belgian Golden Shoe, awarded to the best football player in Belgian Pro League, as voted by press and football personalities
 CSL Golden Boot, awarded to the top goalscorer in the Canadian Soccer League
 European Golden Shoe, awarded to the top goalscorer out of all European domestic leagues
 European Championship Golden Boot, awarded to the top goalscorer at the UEFA European Championships
 Lesley Manyathela Golden Boot, awarded to the top goalscorer in the Premier Division in South Africa.
 MLS Golden Boot, awarded to the top goalscorer in Major League Soccer in the U.S. and Canada
 NWSL Golden Boot, awarded to the top goalscorer in the National Women's Soccer League in the U.S.
 Premier League Golden Boot, awarded to the Premier League top goalscorer in England
 Women's Super League Golden Boot, awarded to the FA Women's Super League top goalscorer in England
 WPS Golden Boot, awarded to the top goalscorer in Women's Professional Soccer in the U.S.
 WNL Golden Boot, awarded to the top goalscorer in the Irish Women's National League
 Pakistan Premier League Golden Boot, presented to the top-scorer of the Pakistani Premier League

American football 
Golden Boot (LSU-Arkansas), American football award for the winner of game between Arkansas and LSU

Rugby League 
Rugby League World Golden Boot Award, an international rugby league award

Others 
Golden Boot Awards, awards in the genre of Western television and movies

Other uses 
Golden boot compensation, an inducement for an employee to retire early
The Golden Boot, shoe shop in Maidstone, Kent, United Kingdom
The Golden Boots, a 15-minute special episode of the British animated series Peppa Pig